Germany has officially participated in every Eurovision Song Contest since its inaugural edition in , except in  when its entry did not qualify past the audio-only pre-selection round, and consequently was not seen in the broadcast final and does not count as one of Germany's 65 appearances. No other country has been represented as many times. The final is broadcast in Germany on ARD's flagship channel, .

The second German victory came 28 years later at the  contest, when Lena won with "Satellite". Germany has a total of 11 top three placements, also finishing second with Lena Valaitis and twice with the group Wind (1985 and 1987), and finishing third with Mary Roos (1972), Mekado (1994) and Sürpriz (1999).

While having not reached the top-ten in 13 of the last 18 contests (2005–22), Michael Schulte achieved Germany's second-best result of the 21st century, by finishing fourth at the  contest. Although German contestants have had varied levels of success, public interest remains high and the contest is one of the most-watched events each year.

History
Germany participated in the first edition in 1956, but their placement in the contest is not recorded as only the winner, Switzerland, was announced. Before German reunification in 1990, the country was occasionally presented as "West Germany". The German Democratic Republic (East Germany) did not participate in the Eurovision Song Contest, and instead took part in the Intervision Song Contest. 

With one win and four second-place results (and ), Germany is the second most successful country in the contest in the 1980s, behind Ireland, who had two wins in the decade.

1996 absence
Due to the large number of countries wanting to compete at Eurovision, the EBU determined that only 23 of the 30 countries could compete. Hosts Norway qualified automatically, the other 29 songs went into an audio-only pre-qualification round, with the top 22 going on to compete alongside Norway in Oslo. Unfortunately for Germany, its entry, Leon with "Planet of Blue", failed to earn enough points to progress to the final, finishing 24th. ARD and the EBU were not happy with this, as Germany was the biggest financial contributor at the time. This is the only time that Germany has been absent from the contest.

2000s
In 2009, ARD held an internal selection for the first time since 1995 due to lack of interest and viewing figures of the German national finals. Alex Christensen and Oscar Loya were selected to represent Germany at the 2009 contest, where they performed on stage with burlesque artist Dita Von Teese. However they only managed to receive 35 points, placing 20th of 25 competing countries.

2010s
In , ARD approached former entrant and songwriter Stefan Raab and private network ProSieben to co-operate in finding a winning entry for the country. Raab agreed and conducted a TV casting show called  which was broadcast on ARD and ProSieben. A winner arose in Lena Meyer-Landrut with "Satellite", who went on to win the contest.

The streak of top 10 finishes was broken in the  contest, when Cascada's song "Glorious" finished 21st with 18 points.

This is the first time since 2012 that more than one country from the "Big Five" has made the top ten (with Italy finishing fifth) and the second time (after 2002) that two "Big Five" countries have made the top five since the establishment of the rule. , the duo Sisters with the song "Sister" was not able to replicate the same success, receiving no points from the televote to finish in 25th place overall with 24 points.

2020s 

Organisation
Since 1996, ARD consortium member  (NDR) has been responsible for Germany's participation in the contest.

Between 2010 and 2012, private broadcaster  worked in partnership with NDR.

Germany has often changed the selection process for the country's entry in the contest, with both national finals and internal selections (occasionally a combination of both formats) having been held.

Germany and the "Big Five" 
These countries earned this special status by being the four biggest financial contributors to the EBU, and subsequently became known as the "Big Four". In 2008, it was reported that the "Big Four" could lose their status and be forced to compete in the semi-finals; however, this never materialised, and the rule remained in place. When Italy returned to the contest in 2011, it was given the same untouchable status, thus upgrading the countries to members of a "Big Five".

However, taking into account Italy’s absence from the contest for the first eleven years of the rule’s existence, Germany remains the only country to have won out of the original "Big Four".

Participation overview

Congratulations: 50 Years of the Eurovision Song Contest

Hostings

Awards

Barbara Dex Award

Related involvement

Conductors

Heads of delegation

Commentators and spokespersons

Over the years, commentary on ARD has been provided by several experienced radio and television presenters, including Ado Schlier, Thomas Gottschalk, Jan Hofer, Wolf Mittler, Fritz Egner and Werner Veigel. Peter Urban has provided commentary on Das Erste every year since 1997, and has only been absent once, in 2009, when he was forced to step down due to illness, with DJ Tim Frühling from HR filling in to commentate at Moscow. For the later-cancelled  contest, Michael Schulte was set to commentate together with Urban. Both commentated the official EBU replacement show Eurovision: Europe Shine a Light instead, as well as the German replacement show Eurovision 2020 – das deutsche Finale from the Elbphilharmonie in Hamburg.

Other shows

Photogallery

See also
Germany in the Junior Eurovision Song Contest
Germany in the Eurovision Young Dancers
Germany in the Eurovision Young Musicians
Germany in the Eurovision Dance Contest
Germany in the Türkvizyon Song Contest

Notes and references

Notes

References

External links 

 Eurovision Club Germany
 OGAE Germany

 
Music competitions in Germany
Countries in the Eurovision Song Contest